Niemeyera is a genus of plants in the family Sapotaceae described as a genus in 1870. The entire genus is endemic to Australia (States of Queensland and New South Wales).  Its closest relative is Pycnandra from New Caledonia.

Species
 Niemeyera chartacea (F.M.Bailey) C.T.White - Queensland
 Niemeyera prunifera (F.Muell.) F.Muell. - Queensland
 Niemeyera whitei (Aubrév.) Jessup - Queensland, New South Wales

formerly included
now in other genera: Amorphospermum Chrysophyllum Pycnandra 

homonym genus
In 1867, Muller used the name Niemeyera to refer to a very different plant, now placed in the Orchidaceae. This name, although older than the 1870 name in the Sapotaceae, is now considered a rejected name. Hence:
 Niemeyera F.Muell. 1867 - syn of Apostasia Blume 1825
 Niemeyera stylidioides F.Muell. - syn of Apostasia wallichii R.Br.

References

 
Sapotaceae genera
Endemic flora of Australia